Park Cities is a term used in reference to two communities in Dallas County, Texas – the Town of Highland Park and the City of University Park.  The two municipalities, which share a border, are surrounded by the city of Dallas and comprise an enclave.

As of the 2010 census, the Park Cities had a population of 31,632.

The Park Cities have among the highest per capita incomes in the Dallas–Fort Worth metroplex and Texas.

In 2000 the Robb Report presented a report which stated that the Park Cities ranked No. 9 in a list of communities with the highest quality living in the USA.

Demographics
Total Population: 31,632
Total Households: 11,590
Total Families: 7,703
Racial makeup:
95.14% White
3.00% Hispanic or Latino of any race
1.84% Asian
1.14% African American
0.89% from other races
0.77 from two or more races
0.20% Native American
0.02% Pacific Islander
Per Capita Income: $80,211
Median Household Income: $121,084
Median Income (Males): In excess of $100,000
Median Income (Females): $43,801

In terms of formal education, the Park Cities rank as Texas' first and second most educated communities. 82.8% of adults in University Park age 25 years or older possess an associate degree or higher, and 80.5% obtained a baccalaureate degree or higher. 76.6% of adults in Highland Park age 25 years or older possess an associate degree or higher, and 74.7% obtained a baccalaureate degree or higher.

Culture
In 1982 the Park Cities Historical Society, which is intended to preserve the community, was founded.

Education
The Highland Park Independent School District serves most of the Park Cities. A small portion of Highland Park (areas west of Roland Avenue) is zoned to the Dallas Independent School District.

University Park is home to Southern Methodist University.

Schools 

 Boone Elementary
 Armstrong Elementary
 McCulloch Intermediate and Highland Park Middle School
 University Park Elementary
 Hyer Elementary
 Bradfield Elementary
 Highland Park High School

Media
The Dallas Morning News is the Dallas citywide newspaper.
 Park Cities News is the official community newspaper since 1938.

References

External links
City of University Park - official site.
Town of Highland Park - official site.
Highland Park ISD
Headlines about the Park Cities from The Dallas Morning News  

Dallas–Fort Worth metroplex
Geography of Dallas County, Texas